Cowley may refer to:

Places

Australia
 Cowley County, New South Wales
Cowley, Queensland, a rural locality in the Cassowary Coast Region
Cowley Beach, Queensland
Cowley Creek, Queensland
Lower Cowley, Queensland

Canada
 Cowley, Alberta

England
 Cowley, Derbyshire
 Cowley, Devon
 Cowley, Gloucestershire
 Cowley, London 
 Cowley, Oxfordshire
 Cowley Road, Oxford

United States
 Cowley, Texas
 Cowley, Wyoming
 Cowley County, Kansas

People 
 Cowley (surname), English-language surname
 Cowley Wright (1889–1923), English actor

Other uses
 Cowley Airport, near Cowley, Alberta, Canada
 Cowley Community College, Arkansas City, Kansas
 Earl Cowley, a British title

See also 
 Cowley High School (disambiguation)
 
 Crowley (disambiguation)